Anolis onca, the bulky anole, is a species of lizard in the family Dactyloidae. The species is found in Colombia and Venezuela.

References

Anoles
Reptiles described in 1875
Reptiles of Colombia
Reptiles of Venezuela
Taxa named by Arthur William Edgar O'Shaughnessy